Longner Hall is a Grade I listed country house in Longner, Shropshire, England, some 2 miles (3 km) south-east of Shrewsbury in the civil parish of Atcham.

It is constructed of red sandstone ashlar in two storeys to an irregular L-shaped floor plan with a plain tile roof  and stands in a 170-acre (70 hectare) landscaped park. The grade II listed chest tomb of an Edward Burton, refused burial at the then parish church of St Chad's, Shrewsbury on his death in 1558, sits in the grounds. 

The hall was built in the Tudor gothic style in 1803 on the site of an earlier house by architect John Nash for Robert Burton, who was High Sheriff of Shropshire for 1804–05. The Burton family had owned the land at Longner since mediaeval times. The gardens were landscaped at the same time by Humphrey Repton. The estate was inherited in 1841 by banker Robert Burton, head of the banking firm of Burton, Lloyd, Salt, How and Co (otherwise known as the Salop Bank) and Mayor of Shrewsbury for a period in 1835 and again in 1843–44. 
He commissioned the Shrewsbury architect Edward Haycock to alter and extend the house and outbuildings in 1838.

The house is still (2016) privately owned by the Burton family, but guided tours are available on weekday afternoons, at 2 pm and 3.30 pm, from 30 May to 1 July, plus Easter Monday, Early May BH and August BH.(2016)

See also
Grade I listed buildings in Shropshire
Listed buildings in Atcham

References

Country houses in Shropshire
Grade I listed buildings in Shropshire